Bernadette Locke-Mattox (born December 31, 1958) is a former head coach of the University of Kentucky women's basketball team. While at Kentucky in 1990, she became the first female to serve as assistant coach for a men's NCAA Division I basketball team, when she served under Rick Pitino. She formerly served as an assistant coach with the Connecticut Sun of the WNBA.

Coaching career

        

1990–1994  Assistant coach - University of Kentucky men's basketball under Rick Pitino
1995–2003  Head coach - University of Kentucky women's basketball
2003–2012  Assistant coach - Connecticut Sun WNBA

USA Basketball
In 1998, Mattox was named an assistant coach of the USA National Team, under head coach Nell Fortner. The USA team competed in the World Championships held in three cities in Germany, including Berlin, Germany. The USA team won all six of the preliminary round games, with most games in double-digit margins. The one exception was the opening round game against Japan, which the USA team won 95–89. In the quarterfinals, the USA team beat Slovakia 89–62. In the semifinal match-up against Brazil, the USA team was behind by ten points in the first half, but came back and won by 14 points. The championship game was a rematch against Russia, a team the USA had defeated by 36 points in the preliminary round. However, the gold medal game would unfold very differently. The USA team was behind most of the game, with a nine-point deficit at halftime. When there were under two minutes to play, the USA was still behind, but Ruthie Bolton hit a three-pointer to give the USA team a one-point lead. After the Russians tied the game, Bolton hit another three to give the USA team a lead they would not relinquish. The USA team won 71–65 to win the gold medal.

Personal life
The former Bernadette Locke is married to Vince Mattox. They reside in Lexington, Kentucky with their son Vincent, who now attends Murray State University in Kentucky. She and her twin sister Juliette are 1977 graduates of Loudon High School in Loudon, Tennessee.

Head coaching record

Sources: SEC records;

Notes

External links
University of Kentucky Website
 WNBA Connecticut Sun Web Page

1958 births
Living people
African-American basketball coaches
Connecticut Sun coaches
Georgia Lady Bulldogs basketball players
Kentucky Wildcats men's basketball coaches
Kentucky Wildcats women's basketball coaches
People from Lexington, Kentucky
21st-century African-American people
21st-century African-American women
20th-century African-American sportspeople
20th-century African-American women